The Arbor is a 2010 British film about Andrea Dunbar, directed by Clio Barnard. The film uses actors lip-synching to interviews with Dunbar and her family, and concentrates on the strained relationship between Dunbar and her daughter Lorraine.

Cast
Christine Bottomley
Robert Emms
Natalie Gavin
Jimi Mistry
Kathryn Pogson
Kate Rutter
Manjinder Virk
Danny Webb

Awards
2010: Nominated, BAFTA award for Outstanding Debut by a British Director, London
2010: Winner, Sutherland Trophy, 2010 London Film Festival Awards, London
2010: Winner, Sheffield Innovation Award at the 2010 Sheffield Doc/Fest, Sheffield
2010: Winner, British Independent Film Award – The Douglas Hickox Award
2011: Best New Documentary Filmmaker, Tribeca Festival, New York City

References

External links

2010 independent films
British docudrama films
2010s English-language films
2010s British films